Stuart Corbett, D.D. (24 May 1774- 25 August 1845) was Archdeacon of York from 27 September 1837 until his death.

A nephew of John Stuart, 1st Marquess of Bute Corbett was educated at Merton College, Oxford. After a curacy at Wortley he held incumbencies at Kirk Bramwith and Scrayingham.

References

Archdeacons of York
Alumni of Merton College, Oxford
1774 births
1845 deaths